Mohamed Ben Boujemaa (born 1922) is a Moroccan former sports shooter. He competed in the 50 metre rifle, prone event at the 1960 Summer Olympics.

References

External links

1922 births
Possibly living people
Moroccan male sport shooters
Olympic shooters of Morocco
Shooters at the 1960 Summer Olympics
Sportspeople from Rabat